Mapuche flag is each of the flags used as an emblem and symbol of the Mapuche Nation and the Mapuche communities and organizations in Chile and Argentina. There are several different flags representing the Mapuche communities and territories.

Ancestral flag

The first records on the use of flags of Araucanian people date back to the Spanish chronicles during the War of Arauco, the more known was described in Canto XXI of the epic poem La Araucana (1569). There, Alonso de Ercilla described in one of their songs, to a warrior named Talcahuano, which inhabited the land near the present city that bears his name, who was followed by troops that wore blue, white and red emblems. The most characteristic feature of the old Araucanian flag is the Guñelve (wünelfe in Mapudungun) that is a symbol from the Mapuche iconography which can be described as an octagram or a star with eight points. It represents the planet Venus, but has also erroneously been thought to represent the canelo tree, which is considered sacred among the Mapuches. The guñelve, also called the "Star of Arauco", inspired  Bernardo O'Higgins in creating the current flag of Chile.

In Chile

In March 1991, the Chilean Mapuche organization Aukiñ Wallmapu Ngulam, also known as Council of All Lands, made a call to make the flag of the Mapuche nation. About 500 designs were submitted, of which one was selected for the Mapuche nation. The flag is called Wenufoye (in mapudungun The Heaven's Winter's Bark).

The colors and forms of this Mapuche flag represents:

Yellow ( or ): renewal, symbol of the sun.
Blue: life, order, wealth and the universe. In Mapudungun, is also an adjective that could be translated as "sacred" or "spiritual".
White: the cleansing, healing and longevity symbol of wisdom and prosperity
Red: strength and power, symbol of history.
Green: the earth or nature, wisdom, fertility and healing power, symbol of the machi (Mapuche shaman).
Cultrun ( or ), a "Mapuche drum": This is a percussion instrument for ceremonial and social use. It has a flat surface in which is represented the Earth's surface. There is drawn the circular design of the mapuche cosmovision: the Meli Witran Mapu (the four cardinal points), and also the sun, the moon, and the stars. This is a symbol of the knowledge of the world. 
Gemil (ngümin) Stepped cross or star, similar to the Chakana or Inca Cross, or rhombus with twisting border: represents the art of the handcrafting, the science and knowledge; symbol of the writing system.

Apart from the Wenufoye, there are five other flags representing the different territories: Huenteche, Huilliche, Lafquenche, Nagche and Pehuenche.

In Argentina

The flag of Argentinian Mapuche people was created in 1987 by Julio Antieco, and ratified in 1991 by the 1st Assembly of Aboriginal Leaders and Communities in Trevelin. The Chubut Province declares this symbol as "official emblem of the aboriginal communities of the province" (Act 4,072).

Their colors and symbolism are:
 Blue: the sky
 White: color of the "holy horse" (mythological spirit)
 Yellow: the sun
 Arrow (Kewpü): symbolizes the war. —When the Mapuche-Tehuelche people recover their dignity as native nation and the war is over, this arrow will be removed—.

References

External links
Mapuche people at Flags of the World.
History and images of the Mapuche flag 
The Mapuche-Tehuelche flag 

Mapuches
Mapuches
Mapuche culture
Mapuches